Charles Simeon Taylor (October 13, 1851 – June 19, 1913) was an American lawyer and politician

Born in the town of Geneva, Walworth County, Wisconsin, Taylor went to University of Wisconsin and then graduated from Whitewater Normal School (now University of Wisconsin–Whitewater) in 1875. He then received his law degree from University of Wisconsin Law School in 1876. He then practiced law in Barron, Wisconsin and was appointed district attorney of Barron County, Wisconsin in 1876. Taylor was the president of the Barron Woolen Mills Company. Taylor served on the Barron Common Council, the Barron County Board of Supervisors, and the Barron City Power and Light Commission. Taylor was a member of the Republican Party. In 1885 and 1887, Taylor served in the Wisconsin State Assembly and then served in the Wisconsin State Senate from 1889 to 1893. He died on June 19, 1913 while attending a meeting of the Masons at which his son Archibald was receiving the society's third degree.

Notes

External links

1851 births
1913 deaths
People from Barron, Wisconsin
People from Geneva, Wisconsin
University of Wisconsin–Madison alumni
University of Wisconsin–Whitewater alumni
Businesspeople from Wisconsin
Wisconsin lawyers
County supervisors in Wisconsin
Wisconsin city council members
Republican Party members of the Wisconsin State Assembly
Republican Party Wisconsin state senators
19th-century American politicians
19th-century American businesspeople
19th-century American lawyers